Several municipalities in the Canadian province of Quebec held municipal elections to elect mayors and councillors on November 3, 1985.

Municipal elections were not held in Montreal, Quebec's largest city, in this electoral cycle. The previous municipal election in Montreal took place in 1982 and the next was scheduled for 1986.

Results (incomplete)

Verdun
Former Liberal Party of Canada Member of Parliament (MP) Raymond Savard was elected to his first term as mayor in the on-island Montreal suburb of Verdun, narrowly defeating Georges Bossé in a crowded field. Bossé's Municipal Action Party won six seats on council, as opposed to only four for Savard's Verdun Citizens' Movement. Former Liberal cabinet minister Bryce Mackasey was defeated in his bid for a council seat.

One of the leading issues in this election was the proposed annexation of Verdun into the city of Montreal. The Verdun Unity Party supported this position and was rejected at the polls; all of the party's candidates, including three incumbent councillors, were defeated. Incumbent councillor Robert Filiatraut was re-elected as a candidate of the Verdun Anti-Annexation Party. Nuns' Island (Division 1) was an outlier in this election, with a pro-annexation independent candidate winning an overwhelming victory.

Party colours in the results listed below have been randomly chosen and do not indicate affiliation with or resemblance to any municipal, provincial, or federal party.

Source: "Final results for Verdun, Hudson, Montreal East," Montreal Gazette, 5 November 1985, A6.

References

 
1985